The 2015 Nadeshiko League season was won by NTV Beleza, who have won the title 13 times.

Nadeshiko League Division 1

First stage : Regular series

Second stage : Exciting series

Championship league

Position playoff

League awards

Best player

Top scorers

Best eleven

Best young player

Nadeshiko League Division 2

Result

 Best Player: Kumi Yokoyama, AC Nagano Parceiro Ladies
 Top scorers: Kumi Yokoyama, AC Nagano Parceiro Ladies
 Best young player: Takako Gonno, Nojima Stella Kanagawa Sagamihara

Challenge League (Division 3)

Regular season

East

West

Championship playoff

 Best Player: Rikako Kobayashi, Tokiwagi Gakuen High School L.S.C.
 Top scorers: Rikako Kobayashi, Tokiwagi Gakuen High School L.S.C.
 Best young player: Miyuki Takahashi, Niigata University of Health and Welfare L.S.C.

Promotion/relegation series

Division 1 promotion/relegation series

 Speranza F.C. Osaka-Takatsuki stay Division 1 in 2016 Season.
 Nojima Stella Kanagawa Sagamihara stay Division 2 in 2016 Season.

Division 2 promotion/relegation series

 Yokohama F.C. Seagulls Promoted to Division 2 in 2016 Season.
 Fukuoka J. Anclas Relegated to Division 3 (Challenge League) in 2016 Season.

Division 3 promotion/relegation series

Qualifying round

Final Round A

 Orca Kamogawa F.C. Promoted to Division 3 (Challenge League) in 2016 Season.
 Mashiki Renaissance Kumamoto F.C. Relegated to Regional League (Kyushu, Q League) in 2016 Season.

Final Round B

 Tsukuba F.C. Ladies Stay Division 3 (Challenge League) in 2016 Season.
 INAC Kobe Leoncheena Stay Regional League (Kansai League) in 2016 Season.

See also
Empress's Cup

References

External links
  Nadeshiko League Official Site
 Season at soccerway.com

Nadeshiko League seasons
1
L
Japan
Japan